Johan Peter Lunde (25 December 1866 – 12 February 1938) was a Norwegian theologian and Bishop of the Diocese of Oslo.

Biography
Lunde was born at Lillehammer, Norway. He was the son of Knud Truls Wiel Lunde (1827–1915) and Mariane Sophie Brun (1835–1911). Lunde graduated artium in 1883. He studied theology at the University of Kristiania and became cand.theol. in 1890. He first worked as a teacher before he was ordained at Kristiansand in 1897. In 1900, Lunde became a parish priest in Bygland. In 1906, Lunde became the resident chapel and in 1910 parish priest at St. Johannes Church in Stavanger. In 1920 he moved to Kristiania (now Oslo) and became a parish priest at Gamlebyen. From 1922 until 1937, Lunde was Bishop of the Diocese of Oslo.

Due to strong commitment to Sunday school and to children's religious education, Lunde became known as the Children's Bishop. His projects included youth work across Norway. Among other roles, he was President of the World Sunday School Council. 
As a bishop, he hosted an international Sunday School Congress at Oslo in 1936.

Personal life
In 1894, he married Helga Tomine Johannessen (1871–1895). He was only married for a short time before his wife died. He lived alone for the rest of his life.  Bishop Lunde was named Commander of the 1st Class of the Order of St. Olav in 1929 and he was Commander of the Swedish Nordstjärneorden.

Selected works
Han utgav ellers Taler og foredrag (1929)
Jesus fra Nasaret (1930) 
Hans Barneprekener (1930)
 Nye barneprekener (1932)

References

External links 
 Johan Peter Lunde, 1866–1938 (Leif Haugen) 

1866 births
1938 deaths
People from Lillehammer
University of Oslo alumni 
20th-century Lutheran bishops
Norwegian Lutheran bishops
Bishops of Oslo
Order of the Polar Star
 Recipients of the St. Olav's Medal